Mladen Čolić (born 1982 in Novi Sad) is a Serbian pianist trained at the Isidor Bajic Music School in Novi Sad under Ivana Branovacki, University of Novi Sad's Academy of Arts and the Paris Conservatory under, respectively, Svetlana Bogino, then Jacques Rouvier and Prisca Benoit.

Competition Record
 2000 - Vladimir Krainev IPC, Kharkiv: 2nd prize
 2004 - Isidor Bajić Memorial, Novi Sad: 1st prize
 2007 - Maria Canals IMC, Barcelona: 1st prize.
 2010 - Premio Jaén IPC: 1st prize
 2011 - 2nd China Shenzhen International Piano Concerto Competition: 2nd prize

References

1982 births
Living people
Serbian classical pianists
Maria Canals International Music Competition prize-winners
Conservatoire de Paris alumni
University of Novi Sad alumni
21st-century classical pianists